Necronomicon (also called H. P. Lovecraft's Necronomicon,  Necronomicon: Book of the Dead or Necronomicon: To Hell and Back) is a 1993 French-American anthology horror film. It features three distinct segments and a wraparound directed by Brian Yuzna, Christophe Gans and Shusuke Kaneko and written by Gans, Yuzna, Brent V. Friedman and Kazunori Itō. The film's ensemble cast includes stars Jeffrey Combs, Bruce Payne, Richard Lynch, Belinda Bauer, Maria Ford, Dennis Christopher, Gary Graham and David Warner. The extensive special makeup and animatronic effects were supervised by Tom Savini and were created by John Carl Buechler, Christopher Nelson and Screaming Mad George.

The three stories are based on three works by famed horror writer H. P. Lovecraft: "The Drowned" has light similarities to aspects of the short story "The Rats in the Walls", "The Cold" is based on the short story "Cool Air", and "Whispers" is based on the novella The Whisperer in Darkness.

Plot 

The film is broken into four separate features: "The Library", "The Drowned", "The Cold" and "Whispers". "The Library" segment is the frame story, which begins and ends the movie.

The Library 
In the frame story of the film, H. P. Lovecraft learns of a monastery where a copy of the Necronomicon is held. Having been a regular there for his research, he sets up an appointment, his cab driver told to wait outside. Taking offense when the head monk calls his work "fiction", Lovecraft insists that all his writings are true. Requesting to read the Alchemical Encyclopedia Vol. III, Lovecraft steals a key from another monk and flees to the cellar, where the Necronomicon is being held. Unknown to him, a monk has seen him. Unlocking the vault where the book is held, the door closes behind Lovecraft unexpectedly, making him drop the key down a grating and into the water below. As that happens, one of the seals is opened.

Lovecraft sits to read and record what he is reading. It is not specified if he sees visions of the future through the book, or if the book contains future accounts. It is likely the stories will come to pass, and for the Necronomicon have already passed, alluding to the Necronomicon'''s timelessness, as all the stories take place well beyond the 1920s.

 The Drowned 
Edward De Lapoer is tracked down in Sweden after inheriting an old, abandoned family hotel. Left a sealed envelope from Jethro De Lapoer, he learns of his uncle's tragic death. Upon a boat trip return to New England, a crash on the shore killed Jethro's wife and son. Distraught, Jethro picked up a copy of the Holy Bible in front of several funeral mourners, tossed it into the fireplace and announced that any god who would take from him is not welcome in his home.

That night, an odd fishman arrives and tells him he is "not alone", then leaves behind an English translation of the Necronomicon. Using the book, Jethro brings his family back to life. However, they are revived as unholy monsters with green glowing eyes and tentacles in their mouths. Feeling guilty, he chooses to commit suicide by casting himself off an upper floor balcony.

Edward, distraught over a car accident years before which killed his wife, Clara, finds the Necronomicon and performs the ritual to revive her. That night, Clara arrives and asks to be invited in. Edward apologizes for the accident. Clara begins to regurgitate tentacles from her mouth, and in a panic, Edward pushes her away. Clara angrily attacks, but Edward, with a sword taken from a nearby wall, cuts her. She turns into a tentacle leading underneath the floor. Drawn underground from the injury, the creature below destroys the main floor and rises, a gigantic monster with tentacles, one eye and a large mouth. Edward cuts a rope holding the chandelier, jumps to it and climbs to the ceiling. "Clara" again tries to restrain him, but Edward destroys a stained glass window, the sunlight driving her away.

Edward pushes the chandelier rope free from the pulley, the pointed bottom piercing the monster in the eye, presumably killing it. Now on the roof, Edward has avoided the same fate that Jethro had years before, and decides to live.

 The Cold 
Reporter Dale Porkel is suspicious of a string of strange murders in Boston over the past several decades. Confronting a woman at a local apartment building, he is invited in, only to find the entire place is very cold. The woman he has confronted claims to suffer a rare skin condition which has left her sensitive to heat and light. Demanding the truth or his story runs as-is, Dale is told the story of Emily Osterman's arrival to Boston twenty years before.

Emily had supposedly taken residence in the apartment building, and was told by Lena, the owner, not to disturb the other tenant, Dr. Richard Madden, a scientist. Her first night, she is attacked by her sexually abusive stepfather, Sam, who has tracked her down. Running away, the two struggle on the steps leading to the apartment next door. Dr. Madden opens his door, grabs Sam's arm and stabs his hand with a scalpel. He falls down the stairs and dies. Emily is bandaged up and given medication. That night, Emily is awakened by the sound of drilling and she sees blood dripping from her ceiling. Heading upstairs, she finds Dr. Madden and Lena mutilating Sam's corpse. She passes out, awakening later in her bed with a clean ceiling. Dr. Madden assures her that it was all a bad dream.

The next day while job hunting, Emily sees two cops with flyers asking for information about the murder of Sam. She confronts Dr. Madden, and he comes clean: though Sam was already dead from the fall, Dr. Madden claims he would have killed Sam regardless for what he had done to Emily. Dr. Madden reveals his copy of the Necronomicon to Emily and explains to her how he learned of its information on sustaining life. In the greenhouse, Dr. Madden proves this by injecting a wilted rose with a compound to revive it, claiming that as long as it is kept out of the sun, it will never die. The two have sex, with a distraught and angry Lena spying on them.

That night, Lena threatens to kill Emily if Emily will not kill her, as Lena is in love with Dr. Madden, a feeling that has never been returned. Emily flees, only to return months later. Upon arrival, Emily finds her boss from the diner in Dr. Madden's apartment, struggling to avoid death. Lena stabs the man in the back, killing him. Lena insists on killing Emily, but Dr. Madden will not allow it. The two struggle, destroying lab equipment in the process. The resulting fire injures Dr. Madden severely, and without his fresh injection of pure spinal fluid, he feels no pain as his body disintegrates before he dies. Lena shoots Emily with a shotgun in revenge. Emily announces her pregnancy, and Lena, feeling a loyalty to Dr. Madden, saves her.

Dale suspects the woman he is talking to is not Emily's daughter, but Emily herself, having contracted a disease from Dr. Madden during intercourse. Emily reveals he is right, and that she is still pregnant, hoping one day that her baby may be born. She also reveals that she has continued murdering for spinal fluid, and chooses to keep a supply stockpiled. Dale realizes his coffee has been drugged as an aged Lena approaches him, brandishing a syringe.

 Whispers 
During a pursuit of a suspect known as "the Butcher", two Philadelphia police officers, Paul and Sarah, are arguing over their failed relationship and the coming baby. The argument leads to a crash, flipping the cruiser upside down. Paul, having unbuckled his seat belt in the argument, is knocked out and dragged off by an unseen person. Sarah unbuckles herself, breaks the window and exits the vehicle. Unable to call for backup, she follows a blood trail alone.

Inside the old warehouse, Sarah follows as Paul is taken down a service elevator. Sarah trips on a rope and falls through to the floor, saved from impact by the rope around her ankle. The rope breaks a second after, and as she gets up, she finds a man in glasses, Harold Benedict. Insisting he is merely the landlord of the warehouse and the Butcher is a tenant, he offers to lead her to him. Downstairs, the two are shot at by Mrs. Benedict, a blind old woman. Sarah, sick of getting a run-around, takes the shotgun and orders the two to lead her to the Butcher. Mrs. Benedict indulges in gossip first, insisting she is not really Benedict's wife. She also claims the Butcher is from another dimension. While searching for the Butcher, Sarah makes her way to a cavern filled with bat-like creatures and other monstrosities, but the Benedicts pull the ladder from the hole, leaving Sarah trapped. As Sarah ventures through the cavern, she starts to become scared, even promising to keep her unborn child. She later sees Paul, but he has already been eaten by the bat-like creatures that inhabit the cavern. His brains are needed by the bats to reproduce. The bats then begin to corner her. She later wakes up on a table, where Mr. and Mrs. Benedict are seemingly trying to feed Sarah to the monster bats.

Sarah suddenly wakes up in a hospital. Her mother and a doctor (who resemble the Benedicts) rush into her room. Sarah was forced to have an abortion as a result of the car accident earlier, but her mother insists that she will be forgiven if she forgives herself. Sarah wants to see Paul, but Paul is brain dead and turns out to be in the very same state that he was found back in the caverns. Sarah screams in terror in spite of her mother's pleas to not scare the baby. Sarah does not understand what her mother is talking about, as she thought the baby had to be aborted. Her mother opens her blouse and reveals that the baby is inside the womb of the monster-bat creatures. Sarah is even more scared, especially after removing her bed sheets and finding out she has lost half of one of her arms. Suddenly, the hospital setting changes back into the cavern. Sarah is still on the table, about to become a meal for the monster bats. Harold wants to leave, but Sarah still has the keys.

 The Library 
With the conclusion of the third tale, Lovecraft is confronted by the head monk, who assures him that all will be fine if he opens the door. Lovecraft admits he dropped the key. Furious, the monk warns Lovecraft to replace the book, but the author is attacked by a monster in the water beneath him, and the last of the seals opens up. The head monk reveals himself to not be human at all, as he begins stretching his body through the bars to enter the room, and Lovecraft uses a sword in his cane to defeat the monster in the water.

Gathering his things and grabbing the book, Lovecraft begins to depart, being caught by one of the monks who warns him of the foolishness of his actions, telling him he will pay for his misdeeds. Lovecraft then escapes to the taxi and orders it to leave, and it leaves unpursued.

 Cast 

 The Library (Frame Story) 
Jeffrey Combs as H. P. Lovecraft
Tony Azito as Librarian
Brian Yuzna as Cabbie

 The Drowned 
Bruce Payne as Edward De Lapoer
Belinda Bauer as Nancy Gallmore
Richard Lynch as Jethro De Lapoer
Maria Ford as Clara
Peter Jasienski as Jethro's son
Denice D. Lewis as Emma De Lapoer
Vladimir Kulich as a Villager

 The Cold 
David Warner as Dr. Madden
Bess Meyer as Emily Osterman
Millie Perkins as Lena
Dennis Christopher as Dale Porkel
Gary Graham as Sam
Curt Lowens as Mr. Hawkins

 Whispers 
Signy Coleman as Sarah
Obba Babatundé as Paul
Don Calfa as Mr. Benedict
Judith Drake as Mrs. Benedict

Critical responseNecronomicon was well received upon its initial VHS release in the US, but did substantially better in European and Asian markets. The film won the award for Best Special Effects at the 1994 Fantafestival.

Craig Butler of AllMovie later described the film as "a hit-and-miss affair", commending the writing of the first two segments, special make-up effects, and David Warner's performance, but criticizing the weak writing of the two remaining segments.

With regard to the acting, Iain McLachlan of SFFWorld commented in 2004 that "Payne is especially effective because of his suppression of his tortured grief, adding considerable power to his scenes".

In their 2006 book Lurker in the Lobby: A Guide to the Cinema of H. P. Lovecraft'', Andrew Migliore and John Strysik opined that the film "does not deliver on what should have been a great idea. In fact the film loses focus, speed, and atmosphere after the first segment, 'The Drowned', almost as though the production had run out of money and time."

References

External links 
 
 
 

1993 horror films
Cthulhu Mythos films
Films based on short fiction
American horror anthology films
1993 films
Films based on works by H. P. Lovecraft
Films based on multiple works
Films set in the United States
Films scored by Daniel Licht
1990s English-language films
Films directed by Brian Yuzna
Films directed by Christophe Gans
Films directed by Shusuke Kaneko
1990s American films